With seven U.S. runway incursions during January and February, the first two months of 2023 saw the highest rate of such incidents in five years. 2018 to 2022 combined had 23 comparable incidents, 5 of which occurred in 2022. The events prompted a review by the Federal Aviation Administration, announced by acting administrator Billy Nolen on February 28, 2023. The review started on March 15. For the first time in 14 years, U.S. aviation industry leaders met the same day at a safety summit. 

The list below includes all newsworthy near miss incidents at U.S. airports in 2023:

Two United Airlines planes collided on March 6, 2023 at Logan International Airport, In Boston Massachusetts.

See also 

 List of accidents and incidents involving commercial aircraft

Notes

References 

Aviation accidents and incidents in the United States in 2023
21st-century aviation accidents and incidents in the United States
Lists of aviation accidents and incidents